The Central Committee (CC) composition was elected by the 16th Congress, and sat from 13 July 1930 until 10 February 1934. Its 1st Plenary Session elected the Politburo, Secretariat and Orgburo. The 16th Congress was the first party convention since the 13th Congress which saw no organized opposition, and the first congress in party history in which there was no opposition to the party leadership. Ukrainian historian Oleg Khlevniuk considers the period 1930–1934 to be a "transitional period" between collective leadership (referred to interchangeably by him as oligarchy) and Joseph Stalin's personal dictatorship (autocracy). The removal of Alexei Rykov, the Chairman of the Council of People's Commissars (SNK, the Soviet government), from the Politburo at the 1st Joint Plenary Session of the CC and the Central Control Commission (CCC) has been marked in historic literature as "the definitive Stalinization of that body [Politburo]" according to Khlevniuk.

The Central Committee elected Stalin General Secretary of the Central Committee at its 1st Plenary Session. Vyacheslav Molotov served as Stalin's deputy, an informal post referred to by Sovietologists as Second Secretary, and was empowered to manage party business and sign Politburo resolutions when Stalin was away from Moscow. Upon Molotov's appointment as SNK Chairman in December 1930, Lazar Kaganovich took his place as Second Secretary.

This Central Committee composition led the party and the country through the first five-year plan, Syrtsov–Lominadze affair, dekulakization, collectivization of agriculture, Ryutin Affair, Soviet famine of 1932–33 (which has led to accusation of "extermination by hunger" by the Ukrainian state), the beginning of the second five-year plan, purges of the last oppositional elements within the party and heightened repression.

Plenums
The Central Committee was not a permanent institution. It convened plenary sessions. Seven CC plenary sessions and two plenary sessions held in conjunction with the convening of the Central Control Commission were held between the 16th Congress and the 17th Congress. When the CC was not in session, decision-making power was vested in the internal bodies of the CC itself; that is, the Politburo, Secretariat and Orgburo. None of these bodies were permanent either; typically they convened several times a month.

Apparatus
Individuals employed by the Central Committee's bureaus, departments and newspapers made up the apparatus between the 16th Congress and the 17th Congress. The bureaus and departments were supervised by the Secretariat, and each secretary (member of the Secretariat) supervised a specific department. The leaders of departments were officially referred to as Heads, while the titles of bureau leaders varied between chairman, first secretary and secretary.

Composition

Members

Candidates

References

Citations

Bibliography
Articles and journals
 
Books
 

Central Committee of the Communist Party of the Soviet Union
1930 establishments in the Soviet Union
1934 disestablishments in the Soviet Union